George Van Peursem (December 18, 1912 – June 20, 1998) was an American politician from the State of Michigan.

Van Peursem was born in December 18, 1912 and was a resident of Zeeland, Michigan.  He was a member of Michigan State House of Representatives from Ottawa County from 1951 until he resigned in 1959.  He was Speaker of the Michigan State House of Representatives from 1957 to 1958.  He served as Chairman of the Michigan Republican Party from 1961 to 1963.  He served as Lansing representative of the Michigan Manufacturers Association from 1963 until becoming president in 1972, serving until 1979.

George Van Peursem died in Grand Ledge, Michigan, on June 20, 1998, at the age of 85.

References 
 Michigan Republican Party on Wikipedia
 The Political Graveyard
 Michigan Manufacturers Association article1 
 Michigan Manufacturers Association article12 
 godutch.com 
 Hope College obituary dates
 Michigan Legislative Biography

1912 births
1998 deaths
American people of Dutch descent
Michigan Republican Party chairs
Members of the Michigan House of Representatives
Speakers of the Michigan House of Representatives
People from Zeeland, Michigan
20th-century American politicians